The Budukhs (Budukh: Будад, Budad) are an ethnic group primarily from the mountainous village of Buduq in northeastern Azerbaijan, one of the Shahdagh peoples. They speak the Budukh language, which is a Northeast Caucasian language of the Lezgic branch. The Azerbaijani language is widely spoken.

History 
The area where the Budukh inhabit was part of the Shirvanshah. The Budukh served in the military for the Shah but were given tax and tribute exemptions. In the early 18th century, the Budukh participated in a Sunni-Shia conflict taking place in Shirvan. However, the conflict soon transformed into a revolt against the Shah which also gained the attention of the Ottomans and Safavids. During the late 18th century, the Budukhs were part of the Khuba Khanate but then became incorporated into the Russian Empire in 1806. 

The Budukhs participated in the Murid War during the mid-19th century. In the Soviet era, the Budukh were faced with collectivization and various socio-political policies that negatively affected their traditional way of life and beliefs.

Culture 
The Badukhs traditionally engage in raising sheep and cattle. The Badukhs also engage in trading and some limited farming, mainly cultivating barely and rye. 

The Budukh people are overwhelmingly Sunni Muslims.

References

Further reading 
 

Lezgins
Budukh people

Ethnic groups in Azerbaijan
Peoples of the Caucasus
Muslim communities of the Caucasus